Boavida Olegario (born October 24, 1994) is a football player. He is the current midfielder for the Timor-Leste national football team.

International career
He made his senior international debut for Timor-Leste national football team on 21 November 2010 coming off the bench in the second half in a friendly match against Indonesia national football team when he was aged 16 years 28 days. He made first tournament debut on 13 October 2012 coming off the bench in the second half in a match against Brunei national football team in the 2012 AFF Suzuki Cup qualification.

References

1994 births
Living people
East Timorese footballers
Association football midfielders
Timor-Leste international footballers
People from Dili
Footballers at the 2014 Asian Games
Footballers at the 2018 Asian Games
Asian Games competitors for East Timor